Giam Choo Kwee (7 May 1942 – 13 August 2018) was a Singaporean chess player. He received the FIDE titles of International Master (IM) in 1976 and International Arbiter in 1983. He won the national Singaporean Chess Championship in 1972 and 1973 and represented Singapore four times in Chess Olympiads (1968, 1970, 1972, 1986). At the time of his death, his official FIDE rating was 1820.

References

External links
 

1942 births
2018 deaths
Singaporean chess players
Chess International Masters
Chess arbiters
Chess Olympiad competitors
Singaporean sportspeople of Chinese descent
20th-century Singaporean people